Beth Aala is a three-time award-winning American documentary filmmaker and film producer.

Life
Aala's parents emigrated from the Philippines to the United States, where she was born. She attended Elk Grove High School in Sacramento. Aala received a bachelor's degree from UC San Diego in both Visual Arts and Communication.

Film career
Aala is best known for her 2013 film, Supermensch: The Legend of Shep Gordon, which she co-directed and produced with comedian Mike Myers.

She was the co-director, with Susan Froemke and John Hoffman, of the film Rancher, Farmer, Fisherman, which premiered at the Sundance film festival in 2017.

Awards
In 2005, Aala won an Emmy Award for co-producing I Have Tourette's but Tourette's Doesn't Have Me. She also received Emmys for producing in the "Outstanding Children's Program" category in 2008 and 2011.

In 2006, she won a Peabody Award for co-producing the film The Music in Me.

References

Living people
American women film producers
American film producers
American women film directors
American people of Filipino descent
Year of birth missing (living people)
21st-century American women